Topuzlu Dam is a historic dam located in Sarıyer district of Istanbul Province in Turkey.

Topuzlu Dam was built in 1750 by Ottoman Sultan Mahmud I (reigned 1730–1754). In 1786, its crest was raised about  higher by Abdul Hamid I (reigned 1774–1789). The dam is named "Topuzlu" meaning "bulged" due to a bulge-formed central part of the upstream wall side. 

The dam is situated just north of Bahçeköy, Sarıyer inside the Bentler Nature Park, which is part of the Belgrad Forest.

It is a solid gravity dam constructed in masonry.

References

Gravity dams
Dams in Istanbul Province
Dams completed in the 18th century
Buildings and structures of the Ottoman Empire
Sarıyer
Belgrad Forest